James W. Thatcher (March 25, 1936 – December 7, 2019)  was an American computer scientist, and the inventor of the first screen reader, a type of assistive technology that enables the use of a computer by people with visual impairments.

Thatcher was also important to the development of the accessibility consulting industry.

Among many other awards, Thatcher was awarded the first ACM SIG Access Award for Outstanding Contributions to Computing and Accessibility for his contributions to digital accessibility in 2008.

Career 
Thatcher earned one of the first PhDs in Computer Science in 1963 from the University of Michigan. His thesis advisor, Dr. Jesse Wright, was blind, and together they joined the Mathematical Sciences Department of IBM Research, to work on practical computing and the development of an audio-based computer access system for the IBM Personal Computer. The result of this work was the one of the first screen readers for DOS, originally called PC-SAID, or Personal Computer Synthetic Audio Interface Driver. This was renamed and released in 1984 as IBM Screen Reader, which became the proprietary eponym for that general class of assistive technology. Thatcher went on to lead the development of IBM Screen Reader/2, the first screen reader for a graphical user interface.

In 1996, Thatcher joined the IBM Accessibility Center in Austin, Texas, where he helped establish the internal IBM Accessibility Guidelines for software development. These guidelines helped inform the later development of the W3C standard WCAG (Web Content Accessibility Guidelines).

Thatcher retired from IBM in 2000, to become an independent accessibility consultant. He retired from accessibility consulting in 2016.

Awards 

Distinguished Service Award (1994), from the National Federation of the Blind for the development of the GUI screen reader
 Vice President's Hammer Award (1999), for work on the development of software accessibility standards with the U.S. Department of Education
ACM SIG Access Award (2008), for Outstanding Contributions to Computing and Accessibility for his contributions to digital accessibility
 Making A Difference Award (2009), from ACM Special Interest Group for Computers and Society, for his career in accessibility

External links 
 https://jimthatcher.com/
 https://highlandscurrent.org/2019/12/12/jim-thatcher-1963-2019/

References 

1936 births
2019 deaths
American disability rights activists
Web accessibility
American computer scientists
American inventors
SIGACCESS award winners
University of Michigan alumni